El Aioun may refer to:

 El Aioun, Taref, commune in El Taref Province, Algeria
 Laayoune, city of the disputed territory of Western Sahara
 El Aioun, Mauritania, town in Mauritania
 El Aioun Sidi Mellouk, city in Taourirt Province, Oriental, Morocco

See also 

 Aioun (disambiguation)
 El Ayoun (disambiguation)